Fellhanera bouteillei is a species of leaf-dwelling lichen belonging to the family Pilocarpaceae.

It has a cosmopolitan distribution.

References

Pilocarpaceae
Lichen species
Lichens described in 1847
Cosmopolitan species
Taxa named by John Baptiste Henri Joseph Desmazières